Jeremiah J. Leahy (31 January 1866 – 26 July 1950) was an Irish Gaelic footballer who played for the Cork senior team.

Leahy made his first appearance for the team during the 1889 championship and was a regular member of the starting fifteen for the next two seasons. During that time he won one All-Ireland medal and one Munster medal. 

At club level Leahy was a double county championship medalist with Midleton.

References

1866 births
1950 deaths
Midleton Gaelic footballers
Cork inter-county Gaelic footballers
Winners of one All-Ireland medal (Gaelic football)
People from Midleton